Below is a list of museums in the province of North Brabant ranked by city.

Asten
Nationaal Beiaardmuseum
Natuurhistorisch Mus. De Peel

Beers
Nationaal Veeteeltmuseum

Bergeijk
AutomusA

Bergen op Zoom
Het Markiezenhof

Best
Klompenmuseum De Platijn, momenteel opgeheven
Museum Bevrijdende Vleugels

Boxtel
Oertijdmuseum "De Groene Poort"
Wasch- en Strijkmuseum

Breda
 Breda's Museum
 Begijnhof Breda Museum
 Museum of the Image formerly Graphic Design Museum and De Beyerd
 Generaal Maczek Museum
 Bier Reclame Museum
 Heemkundig Museum Paulus van Daesdonck
 NAC Museum
 Stichting Princenhaags Museum

Budel
WS-19

Cuijk
Museum Ceuclum

Deurne
De Wieger
Het Dinghuis

Den Dungen
't Brabants Leven

Dongen
Dongha museum

Eersel
De Acht Zaligheden

Eindhoven
Van Abbemuseum
Centrum Kunstlicht in de Kunst
DAF Museum
Historisch Openlucht Museum Eindhoven
Museum Kempenland
Philips Gloeilampenfabriekje anno 1891

Esbeek
Andreas Schotel museum

Etten-Leur
Drukkerijmuseum
Streekmuseum Jan Uten Houte

Fijnaart
Museum en galerie Van Lien

Geldrop
Weverijmuseum Geldrop

Gewande
 Archeologisch en Paleontologisch Museum Hertogsgemaal

Handel
't Museumke

Hank
Bakeliet en Plastic Museum

Heesch
Poppenhuismuseum

Heeswijk-Dinther
Kasteel Heeswijk
Meierijsche Museumboerderij
Interart Beeldentuin & Galerie

Helmond
Gemeentemuseum Helmond
Jan Visser Museum Helmond

's-Hertogenbosch
 Museum De Bouwloods
 Jheronimus Bosch Art Center
 Noordbrabants Museum
 Het Oeteldonks Gemintemuzejum
 Stedelijk Museum 's-Hertogenbosch
 Museum Slager

Nuenen
 Vincentre

Oosterhout
 Bakkerijmuseum
 Museum Oud-Oosterhout
 Speelgoedmuseum ‘op Stelten’
 Kaaiendonks Carnavalsmuseum

Oss
 Museum Jan Cunen
 Stadsarchief Peperstraat
 K26
 Hooghuis stadion Art
 Hooghuis Zuid/West Art
 Torenbeklimming De Grote Kerk

Overloon
Nationaal Oorlogs- en Verzetsmuseum

Ravenstein
Museum voor vlakglas- en emaillekunst

Sint-Oedenrode
Smederijmuseum
Jukeboxmuseum
Museum Sint-Paulusgasthuis

Someren
Museum voor Vluchtsimulatie

Tilburg
 Museum De Pont
 Museum Scryption
 Natuurmuseum Brabant
 TextielMuseum
 Museum voor Naastenliefde
 Museumbrouwerij de Roos Hilvarenbeek
 Museum de Dorpsdokter Hilvarenbeek
 Likeur- en frisdrankmusem Hilvarenbeek
 Boekorgelmuseum Hilvarenbeek
 Landbouwmuseum Hilvarenbeek

Uden
Museum voor Religieuze Kunst

Valkenswaard
Nederlands Steendrukmuseum

Veghel
 Museum SIEMei (Stichting Industrieel Erfgoed Meierij)

Vught
 Geniemuseum
 Nationaal Monument Kamp Vught (WW-II concentration camp)
 Vughts Historisch Museum

Waalwijk
 Nederlands Leder en Schoenen Museum

References 

North Brabant

Buildings and structures in North Brabant
Culture of North Brabant
Tourist attractions in North Brabant